Below are the names and numbers of the steam locomotives that comprised the LB&SCR D1 class, that ran on the London, Brighton and South Coast Railway, and latterly the Southern Railway network. The class names mainly denoted various places served by the LB&SCR. All locomotives were built at Brighton Works unless otherwise noted.

References

Any items not otherwise referenced were sourced from the LBSC website

Sources

D1list
0-4-2T locomotives
LbandScr D1 Class Locomotives
LbandScr D1 Class Locomotives